The BMW 1 Series is a range of subcompact executive cars (C-segment) manufactured by BMW since 2004. It is the successor to the BMW 3 Series Compact and is currently in its third generation. Positioned as the entry level model in BMW range of products, the first generation was produced in hatchback, coupé and convertible body styles. 

Since 2014, the coupé and convertible models have been marketed separately as the 2 Series, therefore the 1 Series range no longer includes these body styles. A four-door sedan model became available for the Chinese market in 2017, using the front-wheel drive platform that is also used the basis for the third-generation 1 Series hatchback. 

A high-performance BMW M version called the BMW 1 Series M Coupé was produced for the first generation. Due to the 1 Series coupé model being replaced by the 2 Series, the 1 Series M Coupé was replaced by the BMW M2 in 2016. 

For the first two generations, the 1 Series uses a rear-wheel drive layout, while all-wheel drive was introduced as an option since 2012. For the third generation introduced in 2019, the 1 Series switched to a front-wheel drive layout, while retaining the all-wheel drive option.

First generation (E81/E82/E87/E88; 2004) 

The first generation of the 1 Series consists of the following body styles:
 3-door hatchback (E81)
 5-door hatchback (E87)
 coupé (E82)
 convertible (E88)

This generation was produced from 2004 to 2013 and is sometimes collectively referred to as the E8x. The E8x replaced the 3 Series Compact as the entry level models of the BMW range. All models were rear-wheel drive, which was a rare configuration in the hatchback market segment. The engines available were four-cylinder turbo-diesel, four-cylinder naturally aspirated petrol, six-cylinder naturally aspirated petrol and six-cylinder turbocharged petrol (the latter only available on coupé and convertible models).

The 1 Series M Coupé is powered by the BMW N54 turbocharged inline-six engine and uses a six-speed manual transmission. It was produced in only the coupé body style and is considered the predecessor to the BMW M2.

Second generation (F20/F21; 2011) 

The second generation of the 1 Series consists of the following body styles:
 5-door hatchback (F20)
 3-door hatchback (F21)

From this generation onwards, the coupé and convertible models have been marketed separately using the BMW 2 Series nameplate.

This generation was produced from 2011 to 2019 and is often collectively referred to as the F20.

The F20/F21 was initially powered by inline-four petrol, inline-four diesel and inline-six petrol engines. In 2015, inline-three petrol and diesel engines were added to the model range. All engines are turbocharged. 

Unlike most hatchback competitors, the F20/F21 uses rear-wheel drive (rather than front-wheel drive) for most models. The F20/F21 is the first 1 Series to offer an optional all-wheel drive (called "xDrive" by BMW).

Third generation (F40; 2019) 

The third generation of the 1 Series was released in 2019. Unlike the previous generation F20 1 Series, the F40 1 Series uses a front-wheel drive configuration with an all-wheel drive option, and sharing its platform with the F48 X1, F39 X2, 2 Series Gran Coupé, and others. The F40 1 Series is only available as a 5-door hatchback.

China-market sedan (F52; 2017) 

The 1 Series (F52) is a four-door sedan that began production in 2017 in China. The F52 has been built specifically for the Chinese market by BMW Brilliance, a joint venture between BMW and Brilliance Auto. Unlike other BMW 1 Series cars of the time, it uses the front-wheel drive UKL platform. The F52 was later sold in Mexico in 2018.

References

1 Series
Compact cars
Hatchbacks
Convertibles
Coupés